Sphegina (Asiosphegina) brevipilus is a species of hoverfly in the family Syrphidae found in China. It's similar to both S. (A.) plautus and S. (A.) simplex; it and S. (A.) plautus are the only known species with a sclerite between the bases of surstyli as well as posteriorly from the cerci.

Etymology
The name comes from Latin ‘brevipilis’, meaning ‘short-haired’, referring to the unusually short pile on the male cercus.

Description
Like other species in its genus, S. (A.) brevipilus is small, slender, and wasp-like. In male specimens, the body length is 5.4 to 5.8 millimeters and wing length is 4.3 to 4.6 millimeters. The face is black, concave with a very weakly developed frontal prominence and long pilose along the eye-margin. The gena and mouth edge are black with a large subtriangular non-pollinose shiny area; frons and vertex black, with a subtriangular area posterior of the lunula non-pollinose and shiny; occiput black with light yellow pilose; antenna brown-yellow to brown with black setae dorsally on scape and pedicel; thorax dark brown to black; scutellum black and subtriangular; pro- and mesoleg yellow, protarsus with tarsomeres 1 and 2 dark brown, tarsomeres 3–5 yellow; mesotarsus with tarsomeres 3–5 brown to black; metaleg with coxa black, trochanter yellow, femur black and yellow biannulate; metatibia black and yellow biannulate, with short, black, apically rounded apicoventral dens; metatarsus entirely black with thick basal tarsomere. The wings are hyaline, microtrichose, stigma yellowish, infuscated at junction of veins R2+3 and R4+5, along crossveins dm-cu and M1 and at the apex of vein R1+2. The basal flagellomere is oval, the arista long and pilose, about 2.5 times as long as the basal flagellomere. Females are much the same except for normal sexual dimorphism; body length is 6.0 millimeters and wing length is 5.4 millimeters. The mesoleg is mostly brown and the arista is about three times as long as the basal flagellomere.

References

Eristalinae
Insects described in 2018
Diptera of Asia